Berna G. Huebner is the founder of the Hilgos Foundation in Chicago, Illinois which supports and encourages the ongoing process of artistic creation with people who have different forms of dementia including Alzheimer's.

She is the co-director    of I Remember Better When I Paint, a 2009 international documentary film which examines the positive impact of art on people with Alzheimer's   and shows how the creative arts can help Alzheimer's patients re-engage in life.

Huebner has served on the Boston University School of Medicine Alzheimer's Board and is Director of the Center for the Study of International Communications in Paris, France. She is the former Research Director for Nelson Rockefeller when he was Governor of New York and then Vice President.

References

External links

WBEZ Chicago Public Radio interview with Berna Huebner - Art Helps Evoke Memory for Those with Alzheimer's
 Paris Writers News interviews Berna Huebner on groundbreaking Alzheimer's film
Interview with Berna Huebner, BrookfieldNow Newspaper
Event honors people living with Alzheimer's Disease, Westborough Community Advocate
Interview with Berna Huebner on Radio France Internationale

Living people
American film directors
Year of birth missing (living people)